The 1925 Yukon general election was held on 7 September 1925 to elect the three members of the Yukon Territorial Council. The council was non-partisan and had merely an advisory role to the federally appointed Commissioner.

Members elected
Dawson - Charles Bossuyt
Klondike - Andrew Taddie
Whitehorse - Robert Lowe

Robert Lowe stepped down from the council shortly after the election to run in the 1925 federal election. Willard "Deacon" Phelps was acclaimed to the vacant seat.

References

1925
1925 elections in Canada
Election
September 1925 events